The Type 279 radar was a British naval early-warning radar developed during World War II from the Type 79 metric early-warning set. It initially had separate transmitting and receiving antennas that were later combined in the Type 279M to single-antenna operation. This set also had a secondary surface-search mode with surface and aerial gunnery capability and used a Precision Ranging Panel, which passed accurate radar ranges directly to the HACS table (analog computer).

Specifications

Notes

Bibliography

External links
 The RN Radar and Communications Museum 

World War II British electronics
Naval radars
Royal Navy Radar
World War II radars